Ludovic Batelli (born 24 May 1963 in Lens, Pas-de-Calais) is a French football manager and former professional goalkeeper who manages SC Toulon. Under his management, the France national under-19 team won their 9th European U-19 title, defeating his ancestry homeland team Italy 4–0.

Managerial career
In March 2018, Batelli was announced as manager of the United Arab Emirates U19 national team.

In May 2021, Batelli became head coach of SC Toulon for the 2021–22 season.

References

External links
 Profile

1963 births
Living people
People from Lens, Pas-de-Calais
Sportspeople from Pas-de-Calais
French sportspeople of Italian descent
French footballers
Association football goalkeepers
Valenciennes FC players
La Roche VF players
FC Annecy players
FC Lorient players
French football managers
Valenciennes FC managers
ES Troyes AC managers
FC Sète 34 managers
Amiens SC managers
Footballers from Hauts-de-France
French expatriate football managers
Expatriate football managers in the United Arab Emirates
French expatriate sportspeople in the United Arab Emirates
French expatriate sportspeople in Belgium
Expatriate football managers in Belgium